The Filmfare R. D. Burman Award is given by the Filmfare magazine as part of its annual Filmfare Awards for Hindi films. Named in honour of music director R. D. Burman, the award recognises new and upcoming talent in the Bollywood music industry. The first R. D. Burman Award was given in 1995.

Winners

See also
Bollywood
Filmi

References

External links
Official website

Burman
Indian music awards